Elections to Manchester City Council were held on 5 May 2011, along with the 2011 United Kingdom Alternative Vote referendum. One third of the council was up for election, with each successful candidate serving a four-year term of office, expiring in 2015. The Labour Party retained overall control of the council, managing to win every seat contested. Overall turnout was a comparatively high 31.6%, although much down on the previous year's general election turnout of 50.9%.

Councillors elected in 2007 were defending their seats this year, and vote share changes are compared on this basis.

Election result

After the election, the composition of the council was as follows:

Ward results

Asterisks denote incumbent Councillors seeking re-election. Councillors seeking re-election were elected in 2007, and results are compared to that year's polls on that basis.

Ancoats and Clayton

Ardwick

Baguley

Bradford

Brooklands

Burnage

Charlestown

Cheetham

Chorlton

Chorlton Park

City Centre

Crumpsall

Didsbury East

Didsbury West

Fallowfield

Gorton North

Gorton South

Harpurhey

Higher Blackley

Hulme

Levenshulme

Longsight

Miles Platting and Newton Heath

Moss Side

Moston

Northenden

Old Moat

Rusholme

Sharston

Whalley Range

Incumbent councillor Faraz Bhatti was last elected in 2007 as a Liberal Democrat but defected to the Conservatives in January 2008. He did not contest the ward.

Withington

Woodhouse Park

References

Manchester
2011
2010s in Manchester